Winchester, Ohio may refer to:

 Winchester, Adams County, Ohio
 Winchester, Brown County, Ohio
 Winchester, Jackson County, Ohio
 Winchester, Richland County, Ohio
 Canal Winchester, Ohio